The Cooper Developmental Road is an outback road in Queensland, Australia. It is sometimes called the Cooper's Creek Developmental Road.

It passes through the town of Eromanga.

Major intersections
This road has no major intersections.

References

Roads in Queensland
South West Queensland